The Belaya is a river in Kamchatka Krai, Russia. It is the most important tributary of the Penzhina, followed by the Oklan.

Course
The Belaya has its source as the Palmatkina in the western slopes of the Vaeg Range, in the center of the Koryak Highlands. It is joined by the Essoveyem from the left and flows roughly southwestwards skirting the southeastern limits of the Penzhina Range, draining the Parapolsky Dol, a plain between both ranges. It approaches the Penzhina in a swampy floodplain with numerous small lakes. Finally it meets the left bank of the Penzhina upstream from Kamenskoye.

The river is fed by snow and rain. It freezes between mid October and mid May. The largest tributaries are the Vetvistaya from the right, and the Khonteklyakkuul, Umkavylkuul, Imlan, Kuyuln, Tundrovaya, Essoveem (Evytkenveem), Gaychaveem (Ilgilkhivayam) and Bolshoy Upupkin from the left.

See also
List of rivers of Russia

References

External links
 Ramsar Sites Information Service - Parapolsky Dol
 Status of reintroductions of three large herbivores in Russia
 Kamchatka Krai travel guide

Rivers of Kamchatka Krai
Koryak Mountains